Lulada is a traditional Colombian beverage from Cali, in the Valle del Cauca Department of Colombia. It is prepared from lulo, a fruit common to the region, lime juice, water, and sugar for sweetness. It often has the texture and consistency of a smoothie and is sometimes served with a shot of aguardiente. A lulada differs from the standard lulo juice in that the lulo fruit is not blended during the drink's preparation.

See also
 Aguapanela

References

Colombian cuisine